The 6th Seattle Film Critics Society Awards were announced on January 17, 2022.

The nominations were announced on January 10, 2022, with The Power of the Dog leading the nominations with eleven, followed by Dune with ten and The Green Knight with nine.

Drive My Car received the most awards with four wins, including Best Picture, Best Director and Best Screenplay. Dune and The Green Knight also received multiple awards with three wins each.

Winners and nominees

Winners are listed first and highlighted in bold.

References

External links
 Official website

2021 film awards
2021 in American cinema
Seattle Film Critics Society Awards